Verticordiidae is a family of benthic marine bivalves in the superorder Anomalodesmata. These clams range from 2 - 200 millimeters in length and are mainly found in coastal waters surrounding Australia and the Americas, though a few species within this family such as Haliris mediopacifica are found in the middle of the ocean. Verticordiidae is known for being a family of septibranchs, or predatory bivalves, rather than filter feeders. Clams dig vertical burrows in substrate and use papillae around the edges of their inhalant siphons to detect microscopic prey. Some clams in this family, specifically in the genus Trigonulina, have distinct extended circular formations on their shells.

Genera and species
Genera and species within the family Verticordiidae include:

 Halicardia Dall, 1895
 Halicardia angulata (Jeffreys, 1882)
 Halicardia carinifera (Locard, 1898)
 Halicardia flexuosa (A. E. Verrill and S. Smith, 1881)
 Halicardia gouldi (Dall, Bartsch and Rehder, 1938)
 Halicardia houbricki (Poutiers & F.R. Bernard, 1995)
 Halicardia maoria (Dell, 1978)
 Halicardia nipponensis (Okutani, 1957)
 Halicardia perplicata (Dall, 1890)
 Halicardia phillippinensis (Poutiers, 1981)
 Haliris Dall, 1886
 Haliris accessa (Iredale, 1930)
 Haliris aequacostata (A.D. Howard, 1950)
 Haliris berenicensis (Sturany, 1896)
 Haliris crebrilirata (Prashad, 1932)
 Haliris fischeriana (Dall, 1881)
 Haliris granulata (G. Seguenza, 1860)
 Haliris jaffaensis (Cotton & Godfrey, 1938)
 Haliris lamothei (Dautzenberg & H. Fischer, 1897)
 Haliris makiyamai (Habe, 1952)
 Haliris mediopacifica (Kosuge, 1979)
 Haliris multicostata (A. Adams, 1862)
 Haliris pygmaea (Kuroda, 1952)
 Haliris setosa (Hedley, 1907)
 Haliris teporis Poutiers & F.R. Bernard, 1995
 Haliris trapezoidea (G. Seguenza, 1876)
 Laevicordia G. Sequenza, 1876
 Laevicordia abscissa (Pelseneer, 1911)
 Simplicicordia Kuroda & Habe, 1971
 Simplicicordia trigonata (Yokoyama, 1922)
 Spinosipella Iredale, 1930
 Spinosipella acuticostata (Philippi, 1844)
 Spinosipella agnes Simone & C. Cunha, 2008
 Spinosipella costeminens (Poutiers, 1981)
 Spinosipella deshayesiana (P. Fischer, 1862)
 Spinosipella tinga Simone & C. Cunha, 2008
 Spinosipella xui J.-X. Jiang, Y.-Q. Huang, Q.-Y. Liang & J.-L. Zhang, 2019
 Trigonulina d'Orbigny, 1842
 Trigonulina novemcostata (A. Adams & Reeve, 1850)
 Trigonulina ornata (d'Orbigny, 1842)
 Vertambitus Iredale, 1930
 Vertambitus affinis (Jaeckel & Thiele, 1931)
 Vertambitus cuneatus (Kuroda, 1952)
 Vertambitus excoriatus (Poutiers, 1984)
 Vertambitus torridus (Hedley, 1906)
 Vertambitus triangularis (Locard, 1898)
 Vertambitus vadosus (Hedley, 1907)
 Verticordia J. de C. Sowerby, 1844
 Verticordia australiensis E.A. Smith, 1885
 Verticordia bordaensis Cotton & Godfrey, 1938
 Verticordia expansa Prashad, 1932
 Verticordia granulifera (Verrill, 1885)
 Verticordia guineensis Thiele, 1931
 Verticordia inornata Jaeckel & Thiele, 1931
 Verticordia ouricuri Oliviera & Absalão, 2010
 Verticordia perversa Dall, 1886
 Verticordia quadrata E.A. Smith, 1885
 Verticordia seguenzae Dall, 1886
 Verticordia tasmanica May, 1915
 Verticordia tenerrima Jaeckel & Thiele, 1931
 Verticordia woodii E. A. Smith, 1885
 Vertisphaera Iredale, 1930
 Vertisphaera cambrica Iredale, 1930

References

 Powell A. W. B., New Zealand Mollusca, William Collins Publishers Ltd, Auckland, New Zealand 1979 

 
Bivalve families